John Talley may refer to:

 John Talley (chemist), American medicinal chemist
 John Talley (American football) (born 1964), American football player
 John Talley (politician), member of the Oklahoma House of Representatives
 John Barry Talley (born 1943), musical director at the U.S. Naval Academy